Eilema cana is a moth of the subfamily Arctiinae first described by George Hampson in 1896. It is found in Assam, India.

References

Moths described in 1896
cana